Ana Jelušić Black (born 28 December 1986) is a former World Cup alpine ski racer from Croatia.

Born in Rijeka, at the time SR Croatia, SFR Yugoslavia, Jelušić specialized in slalom and competed in the 2002 Winter Olympics at age 15, the youngest competitor at those games.

On 4 January 2007, she was the runner-up in the World Cup slalom race (Snow Queen Trophy) at Sljeme mountain in Croatia, won by Marlies Schild of Austria.

A month later at the 2007 World Championships in Sweden, Jelušić finished fourth in the women's slalom.

She has stated that she admires and looks up to fellow countrywoman Janica Kostelić for inspiration, and hopes to follow in her footsteps.

Jelušić sat out the entire 2012 season due to ongoing problems with asthma during the 2011 season. She announced her retirement from competition in April 2012 and became a media coordinator for FIS, focusing on men's alpine skiing.

During her World Cup career, she attained two podiums and 17 top ten finishes, all in slalom.

Personal life
As of 2016, Jelušić lives with her husband in Lausanne, where they both work for the International Olympic Committee.

World Cup results

Season standings

Race podiums 
 2 podiums – (2 slalom)

References

External links
 
 Ana Jelusic World Cup standings at the International Ski Federation
 
 

1986 births
Croatian female alpine skiers
Alpine skiers at the 2002 Winter Olympics
Alpine skiers at the 2006 Winter Olympics
Alpine skiers at the 2010 Winter Olympics
Olympic alpine skiers of Croatia
Sportspeople from Rijeka
Living people
Croatian expatriate sportspeople in Switzerland